Václav Chalupa (born 31 October 1934) is a Czech rower who represented Czechoslovakia. He competed at the 1960 Summer Olympics in Rome with the men's coxed pair where they were eliminated in the round one repêchage.

References

1934 births
Living people
Czechoslovak male rowers
Olympic rowers of Czechoslovakia
Rowers at the 1960 Summer Olympics
People from Jindřichův Hradec
Rowers at the 1964 Summer Olympics
European Rowing Championships medalists
Sportspeople from the South Bohemian Region